Mangala Temple was constructed in the 19th century CE and is located in Village Patia in Bhubaneswar, the capital of Odisha. The enshrined deity is the four-armed Mangala. The deity holds a conch in her upper right hand and a wheel in her lower left hand. The upper left hand of the deity assumes the varadamudra, while her lower right hand assumes the abhayamudra. The deity stands on a pedestal. The temple is located in the Harijan sahi (a residential ward restricted to Harijans) of Patia, whose residents maintain it.

Physical description

Surrounding 
The temple is surrounded by a concrete hall to the east and residential buildings to the west, north and south side.

Architectural features 
The temple stands on a low and square platform, measuring 2.90 square metres and bearing a height of 0.43 meters. On plan, the temple has a square vimana in the dimension. On elevation, the vimana is a pidha deula having a bada, gandi and mastic that measures  in height. The gandi measures  in height. The traditional components of the mastaka, such as the beki, amalaka and kalasa, measures 1.45 meters in height.

Building techniques 
It is built with laterite by Ashlar masonry, cement plaster and white wash construction techniques in the Kalingan style.

See also
 Chandrasekhara Mahadeva Temple
 Kakatpur Mangala Temple
 List of temples in Bhubaneswar

References

External links
 ignca.gov.in
 eodissa.com

Hindu temples in Bhubaneswar